Yusif Sulemana is a Ghanaian politician and member of the Seventh Parliament of the Fourth Republic of Ghana representing the Bole in the Northern Region on the ticket of the National Democratic Congress. He was born in Ghana.

Early life and education 
Sulemana hails from Bole. He holds a certificate in Monitoring and Evaluation from GIMPA and a B.S.C and an E.M.B.A from the University of Ghana.

References

Ghanaian MPs 2017–2021
1972 births
Living people
Ghanaian Muslims
National Democratic Congress (Ghana) politicians
Ghanaian MPs 2021–2025